Kasta  Assembly constituency is  one of the 403 constituencies of the Uttar Pradesh Legislative Assembly,  India. It is a part of the Lakhimpur  district and one of the five assembly constituencies in the Dhaurahra Lok Sabha constituency. First election in this assembly constituency was held  in 2012 after the "Delimitation of Parliamentary and Assembly  Constituencies Order, 2008" was passed and the constituency was formed  in 2008. The constituency is assigned identification number 143.

Wards  / Areas
Extent  of Kasta Assembly constituency is KCs Kheri, Kheri Sri Nagar, Lakhimpur MB,  Oel Dhakhawa NP & Kheri NP of Lakhimpur Tehsil.

Members of the Legislative Assembly

16th Vidhan Sabha: 2012 General  Elections

See also

Dhaurahra Lok Sabha constituency
Lakhimpur Kheri district
Sixteenth Legislative Assembly of Uttar Pradesh
Uttar Pradesh Legislative Assembly
Vidhan Bhawan

References

External links
 

Assembly constituencies of Uttar Pradesh
Politics of Lakhimpur Kheri district
Constituencies established in 2008